Duda-Epureni is a commune in Vaslui County, Western Moldavia, Romania. It is composed of four villages: Bobești, Duda, Epureni (the commune centre) and Valea Grecului.

References

Communes in Vaslui County
Localities in Western Moldavia
Populated places on the Prut